The Platinum's on the Wall is the first video album by American girl group Destiny's Child. It was released on March 6, 2001, by Columbia Records.

The Platinum's on the Wall comprises accompanying music videos for six singles from Destiny's Child's first two studio albums–Destiny's Child (1998) and The Writing's on the Wall (1999). A moderate commercial success, it peaked at number 17 on the US Top Music Videos and was certified gold by the Recording Industry Association of America (RIAA).

Track listing

Charts

Certifications

Release history

References

External links
 Official website
 

Destiny's Child video albums
2001 video albums
Music video compilation albums